Só may refer to:

 Só (poem collection), by Portuguese poet António Nobre
 Só (region), in what is now Bosnia and Herzegovina